David Moore (born 4 August 1964) is a restaurateur based in the United Kingdom.

Biography
Moore was born in County Monaghan,  Republic of Ireland. He is the owner of Michelin starred restaurants Pied à Terre, situated on London's Charlotte Street in an area called Fitzrovia, and L'Autre Pied in the fashionable Marylebone in London's West End. He is a non executive director of award-winning Van Zeller restaurant and of the One Sixty smokehouse restaurants. Van Zeller is in Harrogate in North Yorkshire, in England and is run by head chef Tom van Zeller whilst One City has venues in West Hampstead and in the City of London.

After achieving his Higher National Diploma in Hotel, Catering and Institutional Management (HCIMA), Moore seized the opportunity to do a work experience in the highly regarded The Box Tree, Ilkley in 1985 when the restaurant was of two Michelin Star status. In 1986, he took a position in Le Manoir aux Quat' Saisons, Great Milton, Oxon working alongside world-renowned chef Raymond Blanc. It is here where Moore learned more about the high end Michelin Star dining trade.  Moore also worked for a stint in Le Louis XV restaurant in Monte Carlo's Hotel de Paris.

In 1991, Moore opened his first French fine-dining restaurant, Pied à Terre on Charlotte Street in London's West End. Pied à Terre was an instant success, gaining Michelin star status just thirteen months after opening, and in January 1996 the second Michelin star was achieved. These two stars were retained until 1999. Asimakis Chaniotis is the head chef at Pied à Terre and gained his first Michelin star at the age of just 28. Chaniotis runs the Pied à Terre kitchen and heads up the fantastic team, producing creative and exciting food that continues to delight both diners and critics alike.

In November 2004, a fire forced the closure of the restaurant for most of 2005 but Moore insisted it was immediately rebuilt, redecorated and resurrected back to life to re-open on 26 September 2005.

With Moore as part-owner, Pied à Terre has achieved many more awards including: Four Red Rosettes AA, 8/10 in the Good Food Guide, 29/30 in the Zagat ‘Readers Choice’ and Best Restaurant in the World 2007 as voted in the Top 50 Restauant Magazine. Also it was voted Number 4 in UK Top One Hundred Restaurants in 2008. More recently, Pied à Terre's wine list has been awarded third place in the 2015 Hardens/Sunday Times list of restaurants in the UK.

2007 saw the opening of Moore's second restaurant L'Autre Pied, in the fashionable Marylebone, London. L'Autre Pied is a one star Michelin restaurant which, like its big brother, also specialises in French-style cuisine, in a relaxed environment. Moore can often be seen front of house in both Pied à Terre and L'Autre Pied where he is known for his meticulous attention to detail. In keeping with the Pied tradition which sees head chefs nurture and mentor rising stars in the industry, Graham Long once worked under previous chef Shane Osborn and has now returned to the fold as head chef taking over from Andy McFadden who has moved over to Pied à Terre.

Moore took on his first non-executive director's role in 2008 with the opening of Van Zeller in Harrogate, the creation of chef Tom van Zeller which has gone on to win a selection of awards including The Good Food Guide Restaurant of the Year 2013.

In October 2013 Moore opened his first pop-restaurant, Pieds Nus, just a stone's throw away from L'Autre Pied. The restaurant was around until April 2014 and is won many followers for its simple dishes best shared. In the short time it was open, it received rave reviews from The Telegraph, Hello Magazine, The Evening Standard and many more.

David Moore is also founding partner of the London Cocktail Club, which has gone on to open 6 bars across London. Since 2013, he is also a backer of the Treboom Brewery, as well as a trustee of Cockpit Arts.

David Moore has made several TV appearances including BBC MasterChef: The Professionals and BBC Out of the Frying Pan, both of which aired in summer 2010. He is most likely to be remembered as an inspector on BBC The Restaurant, series 2 and 3, alongside his former mentor Raymond Blanc and fellow inspector Sarah Willingham.

Controversy

During the rail-worker strikes at the beginning of 2023, Moore was criticised for suggesting that striking workers should not take travellers' fares but instead allow them to travel for free on the trains on strike days, despite this being illegal in the UK. He did not suggest his staff offer his meals free of charge to customers if they wanted a raise. 

 Moore also said his message to striking workers would be to 'Get a life' and that the unions should be sacked, which led to calls for a boycott of his business. He did not mention the government's response during his interview.

References
BBC programme - MasterChef: The Professionals

BBC Programme - The Restaurant (Inspector Profiles)

External links
 Pied à Terre, London. DM's 2 Michelin star restaurant.
 L'Autre Pied, London. DM's Michelin star restaurant
 Van Zeller, Harrogate
 Interview with David Moore

British restaurateurs
Living people
1964 births